Alleanza Cattolica (in English Catholic Alliance), at the beginning Foedus Catholicum, is an Italian Catholic association.
Among its members are Massimo Introvigne, president of CESNUR.

An article in magazine Charlie Hebdo argued that Alleanza Cattolica is "the Italian subsidiary" of Brazilian group Tradition, Family and Property.

The aims of the associatione are to study and spread the social doctrine of the Catholic Church.

It was founded and informally constituited by Giovanni Cantoni and Agostino Sanfratello in 1960.

The statute of Alleanza Cattolica dated back to 1998. In 2012 Msgr. Gianni Ambrosio, bishop of Piacenza-Bobbio, withdrew ecclesiastical recognition as a private association of Catholic laymen. 

The magazine "Cristianità" has released a revisionist interpretation of the Italian Risorgimento, based on the thought of the Brazilian Plinio Corrêa de Oliveira, which analyzes the role of the revolutionary forces in the historical process. While accepting the idea of ​​a state extended throughout the national territory, Alleanza Cattolica intends to re-discuss the legitimacy of the secular order adopted following the events of the Risorgimento [[]]

Agostino Sanfratello from Piacenza; Marco Tangheroni from Pisa and Franco Maestrelli from Milan in January 1971 were the first to request referendum against the divorce law in the Court of Cassation [[]]

In the unit of Pisa, dedicated to Saint Henry the Emperor, the pharmacologist Giulio Soldani, the historian Marco Tangheroni, the psychiatrist Mario Di Fiorino and the brothers Attilio and Renato Tamburrini took part to the activities of Alleanza Cattolica 

The relationship of Catholic Alliance with Archbishop Marcel Lefebvre was very strong. Agostino Sanfratello, who had been one of the founders of Catholic Alliance and the brother of the other founder, don Pietro Cantoni, became seminarians of Ecône, in the seminary founded by Archbishop Lefebvre.

On June 6, 1977 many members of Catholic Alliance, baron Roberto de Mattei, the pharmacologist Giulio Soldani , Massimo Introvigne, Mario Di Fiorino and  Attilio Tamburrini (who will manage, together with Alfredo Mantovano, the Pontifical Foundation of the Catholic Church “Aid to the Church in Need”) and his brother  Renato Tamburrini participated in Rome in the conference on the Second Vatican Council of the archbishop monsignor Marcel Lefebvre, invited by Princess Elvina Pallavicini.  

Don Pietro was ordained in December 1978 while Sanfratello left the seminary. In 1981 the relationship between the Fraternity of Saint Pius X and the Italian association was broken: a group of young Italian seminarians left the seminary of Ecône, later incardinated in the Diocese of Apuania by Bishop Aldo Forzoni.

Massimo Introvigne, who was one of the leaders of Alleanza Cattolica, believes that the profound reason for the split between Msgr. Marcel Lefebvre and Alleanza Cattolica  were not political but doctrinal"'. With Msgr. Marcel Lefebvre, a point of friction was also the reading of de Maistre, which for him was the Author of "Du Pape" completely ignoring de Maistre of the original unity of religions ("true religion is more than two thousand years old; it was born on the day in which the days were born").
The turning point of Alleanza Cattolica in 1981, which led to the departure of a series of seminarians and priests from the Ecône  seminary, was due  the "decision of Msgr. Lefebvre of considering  the confirmations of the Conciliar Church invalid and to re-administer them". Cantoni would have considered it as a schismatic act.
Mario Di Fiorino replied to Introvigne that .the archbishop's "prudent doubt" dated back to many years before the conference and Mass at Palazzo Pallavicini (June 6, 1977), which had seen the presence of the leaders of Alleanza Cattolica. In the Church of Saint-Nicolas du Chardonnet in Paris, occupied by traditionalists, on May 22, 1977, Msgr. Marcel Lefebvre, conferring confirmation on more than one hundred boys, expressed prudent doubts about the validity of the sacrament officiated according to the new rite 

Bernard Tissier de Mallerais (2005) wrote in this regard: “The Archbishop also judges that the validity of the sacrament of confirmation is affected by the new "form" of the sacrament, drawn on August 15, 1971 from an oriental confirmation formula which expresses less clearly the special character of confirmation, especially in the sometimes extravagant vernacular translations. The doubt is aggravated when, on November 30, 1972 Paul VI accepted as matter of the sacrament any vegetable oil and no longer just olive oil, contrary to the unanimous Catholic tradition.  In 1975  Msgr. Lefebvre affirmed  to the Cardinals ,who will reproach him for confirming in the diocese without the consent of the Bishops and also for re-confirming under condition : "The faithful have the right to receive the sacraments in a valid way. I have a prudent doubt»,n 1975 

But the doctrinal questions did not seem so decisive. Shortly thereafter, after the election of the new Pope,  John Paul II received Msgr. Lefebvre in a private audience as early as November 1978,and  relations improved with tones and formulations, which foreshadowed an agreement, on  the acceptance of the Council, understood in the light of all Tradition and the constant Magisterium of the Church.
"Ours is an era - says Archbishop Marcel Lefebvre - in which natural and supernatural law comes before positive ecclesiastical law when the latter opposes it instead of being its channel" 
Roberto de Mattei, who was also a leading exponent of Alleanza Cattolica, writing in the death of Giovanni Cantoni, interpreted the 1981 turning point as a choice of political strategy, citing the use of the Trotskyist term "entryism": "In 1978 John Paul II was elected and Cantoni, who had great faith in the new Polish Pope, believed that Alleanza Cattolica should change its strategy, moving from "opposition" to what he defined as "entrism", i.e. collaboration with the authorities and ecclesiastical movements.

References

Religious organisations based in Italy
Catholic orders and societies